Dorothea Sophie of Neuburg (Dorothea Sophie; 5 July 1670 – 15 September 1748) was Duchess of Parma from 1695 to 1727 by marriage to Francesco, Duke of Parma.  She served as Regent of the Duchy of Parma for her grandson Charles of Spain between 1731 and 1735.

Biography

Early life

Born at the Neuburg Palace, as the fourteenth of seventeen children   and the sixth daughter of the Elector Palatine, Philip William of Neuburg, and Landgravine Elisabeth Amalie of Hesse-Darmstadt. 

On 17 September 1690, she married Odoardo Farnese, Hereditary Prince of Parma, heir to the throne of the Duchy of Parma and Piacenza. The festivities for their wedding were the most splendid that had ever taken place in Parma. In their three years of marriage, they had two children, a son who died in infancy and a daughter, Elisabeth, future Queen of Spain.

Duchess of Parma

Her husband died on 6 September 1693, only a month after the death of their son.  On 7 December 1696, Dorothea married Odoardo's half-brother, Francesco Farnese, who had become Duke of Parma when his father died in 1694.

This marriage was decided by Francesco himself, because he did not want to give up Dorothea's dowry should she marry someone else. Nevertheless, this marriage remained childless. 

Francesco died in 1727 and was succeeded by his only remaining brother Antonio.

Regent

Antonio died on 20 January 1731.  The previous day, he had announced that Enrichetta was pregnant; after his death, a Regency council for the potential heir was formed, consisting of Enrichetta, a bishop, the first Secretary of State and two gentlemen of the Court. 

It was decided that, should the child be female, the duchy of Parma would revert to the Infante Don Carlos (then aged 12), eldest of the three sons of Elisabeth Farnese, wife of Philip V of Spain, niece of Antonio by his older half-brother Odoardo, who had been heir-apparent to the duchy but predeceased their father. Enrichetta was thus invested as Regent of Parma, supported by Imperial troops. 

Her pregnancy was questioned by the Queen of Spain though her mother, Dorothea Sophie, who wished to defend the right of Don Carlos, as well as the Pope, who wished to retract the Duchy to the Papal State.  However, Enrichetta was supported by the Emperor, who opposed Spanish influence in Parma.  Of the request of Spain, Enrichetta was examined in May 1731 by doctors confirming her pregnancy.  The news was reported around Parma and then around the European courts. Her regency could thus continue, with support by the Emperor. 

On 22 July however, the Second Treaty of Vienna officially recognised the right of the young Infante Don Charles as the Duke of Parma and Piacenza, pursuant to the Treaty of London (1718).  When Spain demanded that the delivery of Enrichetta should be a public affair, the Emperor retracted his support to Enrichetta and discontinued the original plan to arranged a simulated birth.  

Queen Elisabeth in Spain convinced her mother to have Enrichetta examined again on 13 September 1731; it was then reported that there was in fact no child, and the House of Farnese was extinct. Charles of Spain was thus recognised as Duke of Parma and Piacenza, deposing the regency of Enrichetta d'Este. 
Since Charles was still a minor, his maternal grandmother Dorothea Sophie, was named regent. 

Dorothea ruled as regent until 1735, when the Duchy was ceded to Austria after the War of the Polish Succession. 

She died in Parma in 1748 and was buried at the Sanctuary of Santa Maria della Steccata.

Issue
Alessandro Ignazio Farnese (6 December 1691 – 5 August 1693) died in infancy.
Elisabeth Farnese (25 October 1692 – 11 July 1766) married Philip V of Spain and had issue.

Ancestry

Notes and references

External links

1670 births
1748 deaths
Duchesses of Parma
House of Farnese
Countesses Palatine of Neuburg
Regents of Parma
House of Wittelsbach
18th-century women rulers
People from Neuburg an der Donau
17th-century German people
18th-century German people
Hereditary Princesses of Parma
Burials at the Sanctuary of Santa Maria della Steccata
Daughters of monarchs